La Cave is a former railway station in La Cave, Nouvelle-Aquitaine, France. The station is located on the Coutras - Tulle railway line. The station was served by TER (local) services operated by SNCF on the line between Bordeaux and Périgueux. It was closed in 2017.

References

Defunct railway stations in Dordogne